Kelly McGillis is an American actress. She has appeared in several films since the 1980s including: her role as Rachel Lapp in Witness (1985) with Harrison Ford,  for which she received Golden Globe and BAFTA nominations, the role of Charlie in the Top Gun (1986) with Tom Cruise,  and the role of attorney Kathryn Murphy in The Accused  (1988).

Filmography

Film

Television

Awards and nominations

References

External links

 
 
 
 

Actress filmographies
American filmographies